Ruth Dolores Weiss (born February 23, 1978, in Ashkelon, Israel) is an Israeli musician. She released her second studio album, Be'Ivrit (literally, "In Hebrew"), to critical acclaim in Israel in August 2008. Ben Shalev, Israel's top music critic, writing about the album in Haaretz, said, "Amazing. There is no other word to describe the encounter with the voice, talent, sensitivity, emotion and spirit of Ruth Dolores Weiss." Another Israeli music critic, David Peretz, one of the first to hear Weiss' songs, said it was like discovering Billie Holiday or Björk in Ashkelon, her hometown. Weiss' previous album, Come See (Raw Versions), was released in 2004.

Weiss lived in Austin, Texas, for a few years before releasing Be'Ivrit, but returned to live in Israel with her family to tour, perform and record.

She also composed the soundtrack for the 2012 film Hayuta and Berl.

External links 
 
 Ruth Dolores Weiss' page on MySpace
 Ruth Dolores Weiss' page on Anova Music

Notes and references

1978 births
Living people
21st-century Israeli women singers
Israeli women pianists
Israeli pop singers
People from Ashkelon
21st-century pianists
21st-century women pianists